Walid Bidani (born 11 June 1994 in Maghnia, Algeria) is an Algerian weightlifter. He competed at the 2012 Summer Olympics in the -105 kg event. He competed at the 2016 Summer Olympics in the Men's +105 kg.

He was scheduled to compete in the men's +109 kg event at the 2020 Summer Olympics held in Tokyo, Japan but he was unable to compete as he tested positive for COVID-19.

He won two medals at the 2022 Mediterranean Games held in Oran, Algeria. He won the gold medal in the men's +102 kg Snatch event and the silver medal in the men's +102 kg Clean & Jerk event.

Major Results

References

External links
 

People from Maghnia
Algerian male weightlifters
Olympic weightlifters of Algeria
Weightlifters at the 2012 Summer Olympics
Weightlifters at the 2016 Summer Olympics
1994 births
Living people
Mediterranean Games gold medalists for Algeria
Mediterranean Games silver medalists for Algeria
Mediterranean Games bronze medalists for Algeria
Mediterranean Games medalists in weightlifting
Competitors at the 2013 Mediterranean Games
Competitors at the 2022 Mediterranean Games
African Weightlifting Championships medalists
21st-century Algerian people